This page documents all tornadoes confirmed by various weather forecast offices of the National Weather Service in the United States in December 2021. It was by far the most active December on record with 227 tornadoes confirmed, more than double the previous record of 99 set in 2002. It also set the record for the most active month for tornado activity in meteorological winter, surpassing the previous record of 216 set in January 1999.  Most of them occurred as a result of two very large, record-breaking tornado outbreaks four days apart.The average number of tornadoes in December is 24.

United States yearly total

December

December 5 event

December 6 event

December 8 event

December 10 event

December 11 event

December 15 event

December 18 event

December 21 event

December 29 event

December 30 event

December 31 event

See also

 Tornadoes of 2021
 List of United States tornadoes from October to November 2021
 List of United States tornadoes from January to March 2022

Notes

References

2021-related lists
Tornadoes of 2021
Tornadoes
2021, 12
2021 natural disasters in the United States
Tornadoes in the United States